Juice is the sixth studio album and third solo album by American country-rock singer Juice Newton. The album was released in February 1981 and was her first major international success.

Hits

The album features two #1 hits, "Angel of the Morning" and "The Sweetest Thing (I've Ever Known)". It also contains "Queen of Hearts," the biggest-selling single of Juice Newton's career, which peaked at #2 on both Billboard's Hot 100 and Adult Contemporary charts ("Endless Love" by Diana Ross and Lionel Richie prevented the song from reaching #1). "Queen of Hearts" was a popular music video during the summer of MTV's debut. Newton would go on to have more hit songs and albums, but this remains the album for which she is best known.

In 1984, a fourth track from Juice, titled "Ride 'Em Cowboy", was released in support of Newton's first "Greatest Hits" album. The single reached #32 on the U.S. Billboard Country charts.

Two versions of the album exist. Early releases feature the original pedal steel guitar-heavy country version of "The Sweetest Thing (I've Ever Known)," subsequently replaced by the more pop-friendly remix that was issued as a single. Early editions have the artist's name in blue outlined letters on the front of the jacket. Later editions with this remix have the artists name with the lettering filled in with cream or off white.

Awards
Juice garnered Juice Newton two "Best Female Vocalist" Grammy Award nominations (in the Pop and Country categories, respectively) neither of which she won. But she did win her first Grammy for her follow-up album Quiet Lies.

Track listing

Personnel
Juice Newton - acoustic guitar, lead vocals, backing vocals
Chuck Martin, George Doering, Mitch Holder, Otha Young, Tim May - electric guitar
Billy Joe Walker Jr., Dennis Budimir, Fred Tackett - acoustic guitar
Dan Dugmore, Doug Livingston, Jay Dee Maness - pedal steel guitar
Philip Aaberg - keyboards
Neil Stubenhaus, Scott Chambers - bass
Rick Shlosser - drums
Steve Forman - percussion
Brad Felton - banjo
Andrew Gold, Brock Walsh, Harry Stinson, Jim Haas, Jon Joyce, Kenny Edwards, Lewis Morford, Stan Farber - backing vocals

Production
Produced by Richard Landis
Associate Producer: Otha Young
Engineered by Joe Chiccarelli
Assistant Engineers: David Cole, Hugh Davies, Mitch Gibson, Karen Siegel
Mixing: Michael Verdick
Mastering: Wally Traugott

Chart performance

Charting Singles

Certifications

References

1981 albums
Juice Newton albums
Capitol Records albums
Albums produced by Richard Landis